Emilio Larraz López (born 18 February 1968) is a Spanish football manager.

Coaching career
Born in Zaragoza, Aragon, Larraz started his career with hometown side CD San Agustín's youth setup in 1990. In 1998, after stints at AD Stadium Casablanca and CD Oliver, he was appointed manager of his first senior side, CF Illueca in Tercera División.

Larraz continued to manage in the category in the following campaigns, being in charge of Andorra CF (two stints), FC Andorra, CD Sariñena, CD Teruel and CD La Muela (achieving promotion to Segunda División B with the latter) before joining Real Zaragoza in 2010 as manager of the reserves, also in the fourth tier. He also achieved promotion with the B's, but left for CD Sariñena on 7 July 2011.

On 18 June 2013, after leading Sariñena to their first-ever promotion to the third tier, Larraz returned to Zaragoza and its B-team. He was dismissed in October of the following year, being appointed in charge of CD Ebro on 12 June 2015.

On 23 May 2018, despite finishing sixth and only four points shy of the play-offs, Larraz opted to leave Ebro. On 22 June, he was appointed in charge of Racing de Ferrol, immediately achieving promotion to division three in his first season.

On 10 February 2021, Larraz was dismissed by Racing after more than two years in charge of the club.

On 3 July 2021, Larraz signed up by Deportivo Aragón, the reserve team of Real Zaragoza.

References

External links

Living people
1968 births
Sportspeople from Zaragoza
Spanish football managers
Segunda División B managers
Tercera División managers
FC Andorra managers
Racing de Ferrol managers